Lawrence Addicks (March 3, 1878 - January 16, 1964) was president of the Electrochemical Society from 1915 to 1916. He was a member of the Naval Consulting Board during World War I starting in 1915.

Biography
He was born on March 3, 1878, in Philadelphia, Pennsylvania, to Charles H. Addicks and Mary Knox Buzby. He attended the Massachusetts Institute of Technology and graduated in 1889. He married Mary Maulsby O'Brien (1878-1964).

He was president of the Electrochemical Society from 1915 to 1916. He was a member of the Naval Consulting Board during World War I starting in 1915.

He died on January 16, 1964, in Maryland. He was buried in Christ Church Cemetery in Forest Hill, Maryland.

External links

References

1878 births
1964 deaths
Naval Consulting Board
Massachusetts Institute of Technology alumni
Presidents of the Electrochemical Society